Joiceya praeclarus is a species of butterfly in the family Riodinidae. It is monotypic within the genus Joiceya. It is endemic to Brazil.

References

Nymphidiini
Arthropods of Brazil
Endemic fauna of Brazil
Riodinidae of South America
Taxonomy articles created by Polbot